is a Japanese manga series written and illustrated by Tugeneko. It was serialized in Hakusensha's seinen manga magazine Young Animal from February 2015 to March 2022. A twelve-episode anime television series adaptation by Lesprit aired from January to March 2019.

Characters

Media

Manga
Written and illustrated by Tugeneko, How Clumsy you are, Miss Ueno was serialized in Hakusensha's seinen manga magazine Young Animal from February 27, 2015, to March 24, 2022. Hakusensha collected its chapters in ten tankōbon volumes, released from September 29, 2016, to May 27, 2022.

Volume list

Anime
An anime television series adaptation was announced in May 2018. The series was directed and written by Tomohiro Yamanashi, with animation by studio Lesprit. Ayano Ōwada provided the character designs, while Nobuyuki Abe was the sound director. Yasuhiro Misawa composed the series' music at Nippon Columbia, and Gathering was credited with cooperation. The series aired from January 6 to March 24, 2019, and was broadcast on BS11, Tokyo MX, and J:COM TV. Miku Itō performed the series' opening theme song , while Yū Serizawa, Aimi Tanaka, and Akari Kageyama performed the series' ending theme song . The series is licensed by Sentai Filmworks in North America, Australasia, and the British Isles, and simulcast the series on Hidive. The English dub was released on July 6, 2019.

Episode list

Reception
Gadget Tsūshin listed "You tried to touch my titties!" (a phrase from the third episode) in their 2019 anime buzzwords list.

Notes

References

External links
  
  
 

Anime series based on manga
Hakusensha franchises
Hakusensha manga
Lesprit
Romantic comedy anime and manga
Seinen manga
Sentai Filmworks